The men's team pursuit was a track cycling event held as part of the Cycling at the 1964 Summer Olympics programme.  The course was 4000 metres.  It was held on 19 October and 21 October 1964 at the Hachioji Velodrome.  18 teams of 4 cyclists each competed.

Medalists

Results

Heats

In the first round of heats, the 18 teams were divided into 9 pairs.  Placing in the heats was not used to advance; rather, the 8 fastest teams from across the heats advanced to the quarterfinals.

Quarterfinals

The quarterfinals paired off the 8 remaining teams into 4 heats.  Winners advanced, losers were eliminated.

Semifinals

The winner of each semifinal advanced to the gold medal match, while the loser was sent to the bronze medal match.

Finals

Sources

References

Cycling at the Summer Olympics – Men's team pursuit
Track cycling at the 1964 Summer Olympics